The Salouva, is a traditional dress of the Mahorese woman.

See also 
 Culture of Mayotte

References 

Mahoran culture
Clothing